Tovir (also Romanized as Ţovīr, Tavār, Ţavīr, and Tovīr; also known as Ţowvīr and Tuvīr) is a village in Kuhestan Rural District, Kelardasht District, Chalus County, Mazandaran Province, Iran. At the 2006 census, its population was 329, in 91 families.

References 

Populated places in Chalus County